Luo Niansheng (12 July 1904 – 10 April 1990) was a Chinese translator. He was known for translating Ancient Greek literature into Chinese.

Biography
Luo was born in Weiyuan County, Sichuan in July 1904.

He entered Tsinghua University in 1922. After graduation, Luo studied in Ohio State University, Columbia University and Cornell University. Luo returned to China in 1934, and he worked as a professor in Peking University, Sichuan University, and Tsinghua University. Later, Luo was transferred to Chinese Academy of Social Science to work as a researcher.

Luo died of cancer in Beijing in 1990, at the age of 86.

Works

Translations
 Works of Aeschylus's
 Works of Sophocles's
 Works of Euripides's
 Works of Aristophanes's
 Rhetoric
 Poetics
 Aesop's Fables
 Parallel Lives

Awards and Honour
 Royal Swedish Academy of Sciences - The Highest Prize for Literature and Art (December 1987)

Personal life
Luo married Ma Wanyi, the couple had two sons, Luo Jinlin and Luo Jinwen.

References

Further reading
 Marianne McDonald: The living art of Greek tragedy, S. 76

1904 births
Tsinghua University alumni
Ohio State University alumni
Columbia University alumni
Cornell University alumni
People's Republic of China translators
1990 deaths
20th-century Chinese translators
Writers from Neijiang